Satanic Sanction was an EP by Sleep Chamber, featuring the lineup of John Zewizz and Jonathan Briley, with help from Larry Van Horn and Laura Chopelas.

Originally released as a 12" vinyl EP on the Italian label Musica Maxima Magnetica (catalog EEE 02), it was reissued in 1999, expanded by five tracks, by US label RRRecords (catalog XXX-PROMO-05), limited to only 50 copies. In 2010, Satanic Sanction was again reissued, by Austrian label Klanggalerie (catalog GG138). The original recordings were mastered at Newburry Sound in Boston by Jeff Dovner.

1988 EP track listing
Side A:
 Prescription
 Presence on the Magis
 Presence (Reprise)

Side B:
 Entre Nous
 Ov This Flesh
 Poison
 Consequence or Commitment?

1999 CD track listing
 Reality Revealed
 Ov This Flesh
 Poison
 Entre Nous
 Prescription
 Idols Twilight
 Mandrax & Stryx
 Bloodlust
 Nightbreed
 Consequence or Commitment
 Presence ov the Magus
 Presence (reprise)

2010 CD track listing
 Reality Revealed
 Ov This Flesh
 Poison
 Entre Nous
 Prescription
 Idols Twilight
 Mandrax & Stryx
 Bloodlust
 Nightbreed
 Consequence or Commitment
 Presence ov the Magus
 Moon Child
 Weapons ov Magick

References
http://www.discogs.com/Sleep-Chamber-Satanic-Sanction/release/1240200
http://www.discogs.com/Sleep-Chamber-Satanic-Sanction/release/322296
http://www.discogs.com/Sleep-Chamber-Satanic-Sanction/release/2331577
http://www.freewebs.com/theebradmiller/satanicsanction.htm

1988 albums